Jonas Björkman & Kevin Ullyett were the defending champions, but Björkman retired in 2008.
Ullyett teamed up with Bruno Soares, but they lost in the second round against František Čermák and Michal Mertiňák.
Daniel Nestor and Nenad Zimonjić won in the final 6–3, 6–4, against Marcel Granollers and Tommy Robredo.
With this win, Nestor completed a Career Golden Masters, having won all nine ATP Tour Masters 1000 events. He was the first player to do so.

Seeds
All seeds receive a bye into the second round

Draw

Finals

Top half

Bottom half

External links
 Main Draw

BNP Paribas Masters - Doubles
Doubles, 2009 Bnp Paribas Masters